Bortala (Mountain:brown steppe) is an autonomous prefecture for Mongol people in the northern middle of Xinjiang Uyghur Autonomous Region, Western China. Bole is its capital. "Boro tala" comes from the Mongolian language and means "brown steppe".

Geography
Bortala is located in the southwestern part of the Dzungarian Basin. It occupies a V-shaped basin between the Dzungarian Alatau in the northwest and the Borohoro Mountains in the southwest.

To the east it borders Wusu City and Toli County of Tacheng Prefecture; to the south it borders Nilka County, Yining County, and Huocheng County of Ili Kazakh Autonomous Prefecture.

The prefecture has two large lakes, Ebi-Nur and Sayram Lake.

Administrative divisions
Bortala is divided into two county-level cities, Bole and Alashankou; and two counties: Jinghe County and Wenquan County. In addition, it is home to the Fifth Agricultural Division of the Xinjiang Production and Construction Corps and its 11 regiment-level farms / ranches.

History

During the Yuan and Ming dynasties, the area was the territory of the Oirats. Chahar Mongols were moved here during the Qing dynasty from Kalgan, while Torghuud Oirats moved eastwards from the Volga.

The People's Republic of China established the autonomous prefecture on July13, 1954.

Demographics
There are 35 nationalities in Bortala. According to the 2010 census, 65% of the 443,680 inhabitants are Han Chinese, while the remainder are Mongol, Uyghur, Kazakh, Hui or of other nationalities.

Population by ethnicity as of 2000 and 2010.

Economy
In 2004 the prefecture had a total gross domestic product of 3.69 billion Renminbi (including the XPCC 5th division), an increase of 11.9% over the previous year. Annual total imports and exports totalled US$ 554 million, an increase of 96.8% over the previous year. Average annual salary was 11000 Renminbi, an increase of 7.6%; average annual pure income per capita for agricultural workers was 3904 Renminbi, an increase of 10.8%.

Transport
Alashankou is a port of entry with both railroads and roads linking China with Kazakhstan; it is also one of China's national first-class port of entry. The volume of imports / exports passing through Alashankou accounts for 90% of the total for all of Xinjiang, and has been second to only Manzhouli, Inner Mongolia among land ports-of-entry in China for 8 days.

See also
Ethnic Mongols in China

References

External links
Bortala Government website
Bortala Government website

Prefecture-level divisions of Xinjiang
Autonomous prefectures of the People's Republic of China
Mongols in China
1954 establishments in China